The Milan Triennial XI was the Triennial in Milan of 1957 sanctioned by the Bureau of International Expositions (BIE). Its theme was Improving the Quality of Expression in Today’s Civilisation.

Contents
There was a survey of sculpture of the previous 50 years, showing works by Umberto Boccioni, Constantin Brâncuși, Alexander Calder, Arturo Martini, Henri Matisse, Henry Moore, Pablo Picasso, Pierre-Auguste Renoir and Auguste Rodin.

Gillo Dorfles, Leonardo Ricci, Luigi Rosselli and Marco Zanuso organised an industrial product exhibition. And  an architecture section.

Timo Sarpaneva won 2 Grand Prix, Kaj Franck and Dora Jung one each. 
Antti Nurmesniemi, Yki Nummi, Ilmari Tapiovaara, Vuokko Eskolin, Bertel Gardberg
and Sori Yanagi won gold medals, Yanagi's for his butterfly stool. 
Saara Hopea won a silver medal for her flamingo liqueur glasswork.

The USA pavilion was designed by Walter Dorwin Teague and Paul McCobb.

References 

1957 in Italy
Tourist attractions in Milan
World's fairs in Milan